"Laughing" is a popular song by Canadian rock band The Guess Who. It peaked at #1 on the Canadian Singles Chart for a single week and at #10 on the United States' Billboard Hot 100, becoming the band's second single to reach the Top 10 on the latter.  It became their second of three gold records in the United States and also made the Top 20 on singles charts in New Zealand and South Africa.

It appeared on their 1969 album, Canned Wheat, and was released as a single that year. It sold more than 350,000 copies in the first three weeks of release.

Critical reception
Dave Bist of The Montreal Gazette has written that "These Eyes" and "Laughing" gave its audience the impression that the group only made music for the money.  "Undun", the group's third "biggie", and "No Time", he wrote, changed that impression.

Promo video

A rare black and white music video for the song exists.

Personnel
Burton Cummings - lead vocals, keyboards, rhythm guitar
Randy Bachman - lead guitar, backing vocals
Jim Kale - bass, backing vocals
Garry Peterson - drums

Chart performance

Weekly charts

Year-end charts

Cover versions
The song has been covered by saxophonist Dave Pell.

Uses in popular culture
An edited version of the song is used in an Instagram post by film director Todd Phillips as foreground music of a camera test for 2019's Joker, featuring Joaquin Phoenix starring as the DC Comics character The Joker.

It was also used in trailers for the 2017 horror film Jigsaw; the sequel/soft-reboot of the Saw film series.

References

External links
 

1969 songs
1969 singles
Songs written by Randy Bachman
Songs written by Burton Cummings
The Guess Who songs
Song recordings produced by Jack Richardson (record producer)
RPM Top Singles number-one singles
RCA Victor singles